Jean Louis Pesch, from his real name Jean-Louis Poisson (born June 29, 1928), is a French author of comics series, including Sylvain et Sylvette.

Biography
Born on 29 June 1928, he has lived at Juvardeil, a small village in Anjou (France). There he learned to love nature and animals. His parents being both artists, he discovered during his youth the works of several cartoonists, among them Maurice Cuvillier. He read from 1934 Mickey magazine, Junior, Aventures, Robinson, Hop-là!. and various albums.

At 14, he passed the entrance exam of l'Ecole des Arts Appliqués in Paris. During the war, he returned to Juvardeil to work in farming. In 1945, he got employed in the navy for three years, and then worked in animation. In 1950 he founded an advertisement studio. He worked in magazines for children beginning in 1954: Capucine, Mireille, L'intrepide, Bernadette, Coeurs Vaillants, Ames Vaillantes, Fripounet et Marisette, Le Pelerin, and Tintin. In that time, he created many comics heroes and published some animal stories at Fleurus editions.

He also launched Pinpinville, adventures inspired from Le Roman de Renard. As a specialist of animal illustrations, he proposed to take over the Sylvain et Sylvette series in 1956, at Cuvillier's death. In 1964, he created with Henriette Robitaillie the series Bec-en Fer published in Le Pelerin. In 1980, he took over alone this series. This series, in which he denounces comically violence, malice, stupidity and fanaticism, is dedicated to older persons. Seven albums were published between 1980 and 1995. In 1981, he took over Louis Forton and Pellos' Pieds Nickelés.

Awards
In 1974, Pesch was named best wildlife artist at the Toulouse Salon of comics. In 1992 he received the Youth prize at the Illzach festival.

References

External links 
 Biography on BD Paradisio 
 Jean-Louis Pesch, monstre méconnu de la BD on Ouest France 
 BD : Sylvain, Sylvette et compères dans le village d'enfance de leur dessinateur on Le Point 
 Dans la douceur angevine... on Vosges Matin 

1928 births
Living people
French comics artists
French comics writers
French male writers